Sana Maulit Muli is a 1995 Filipino romantic drama film directed by Olivia M. Lamasan starring Lea Salonga and Aga Muhlach, their second film together after the 1992 romantic melodrama film, Bakit Labis Kitang Mahal.

The critically acclaimed film won 1 award at the FAMAS Awards, and was nominated for 4, including Best Picture, Best Screenplay, and Best Actor & Actress for Lea Salonga and Aga Muhlach. It also received 6 wins at the Gawad Urian Award, including Best Picture and Best Screenplay and was also nominated for 6 categories. The film also won 3 awards and was nominated for 4 at the Luna Awards, which was then known as the FAP Awards.

In celebration of its 20th anniversary, the film was digitally restored and screened at the Cine Adarna, University of the Philippines Film Institute.

Plot
Agnes is a meek and dependent girl living with her long-time boyfriend Jerry. When she is invited to live with her estranged mother in California, Jerry pushes her to go through with the trip despite her protests, for him to focus on his work and build his career as an advertising executive. Agnes struggles to survive in the United States and tries several times to return to the country, but Jerry insists on prolonging her stay as he struggles to save up for their marriage and support his parents and siblings. He encourages her to get a job and Agnes starts working as a caregiver. Agnes tries to convince Jerry to let her return again and reasons that she has the money to support herself but Jerry insists that as the man of the relationship, he should be capable of supporting her. Jerry starts to avoid Agnes, stressing Agnes out more. The long distance puts a strain on their relationship and ultimately ends when a scared and distraught Agnes is unable to contact Jerry after being put in danger one night. Time passes and Agnes becomes more independent and outgoing, working hard until she lands a job as a real estate agent. Meanwhile, Jerry travels to the United States and visits Agnes, with the intention of getting her back. Jerry is overwhelmed by the cultural difference of the United States and the Philippines, Agnes' success in her career, and the changes in Agnes herself. Despite this, they still manage to mend their relationship, but Jerry accepts that he is simply unsuited for the kind of lifestyle they have in the United States. He leaves Agnes and decides to return home to the Philippines.

Days later, Jerry returned to his former job in the advertising agency. After the work is done, he walks alone in the busy street and suddenly, he notices in the back and he found that Agnes has returned to the Philippines. The two were happily reunited and they walked together as the screen slowly fades.

Cast
Aga Muhlach as Gerardo "Jerry" Morales
Lea Salonga as Agnes Sarmiento
William Martinez as Nick
Tina Paner as Daisy
Rosemarie Sonora as Sylvia
Cherry Pie Picache as Cynthia
Tommy Abuel as Ben
Gina Pareño as Lita
Lorli Villanueva as Tiya Nena
Raul Aragon as Rolly
Ric Arellano as Carding
Eula Valdez as Margie
Lorenzo Mara as Tony
Mandy Ochoa as Chito
Bill Recana as Dave Whitman

Production
The film was shot in the Philippines and San Francisco. Some US scenes were shot in Baguio due to the presence of the pine trees and log cabins in the penultimate part of the film.

Olivia M. Lamasan, the film's director, was 32 years old at the time of its production and Sana Maulit Muli was her first romantic drama film and second film to be directed by Lamasan herself.

Music 
The film's theme song "Sana Maulit Muli" was originally written by Gary Valenciano in English and it was a tribute to late young actress Julie Vega who died in 1985. His wife, Angeli Pangilinan-Valenciano, translated the song into Filipino.

Release
The film was first screened in theaters on August 9, 1995. It is the first film of Star Cinema to be done abroad and their first OFW film.

Digital restoration
In 2015, the film was digitally restored with the help of ABS-CBN Film Archives and Central Digital Lab, supervised by Manet A. Dayrit and Rick Hawthorne, who started working on its restoration as early as 2013. It was screened at the Cine Adarna, University of the Philippines Film Institute on July 10. The premiere of the restored version was attended by the film's director Olivia M. Lamasan; the lead stars Aga Muhlach and Lea Salonga; Aga Muhlach's wife Charlene Gonzales-Muhlach and their twin children Andres and Atasha; director Joyce Bernal, and ABS-CBN's Head of Creative Communications Management, Robert Labayen.

Home media and television broadcast
The restored version of the film was released through iTunes on September 21, 2015, in the selected territories: US, UK, Japan, Israel, Taiwan, Hong Kong, Vietnam, Thailand, Macau and the Philippines.

It also received a television premiere on ABS-CBN on Maundy Thursday, March 24, 2016, at 10:00PM and the showing received a nationwide rating of 9.2%, losing to GMA Network's Holy Week showing of 2013 Korean film Miracle in Cell No. 7, which attained a nationwide rating of 14.6%.

Reception

Critical reception
Lily Grace Tabanera of Cosmopolitan Philippines called Sana Maulit Muli a classic after observing the pros and cons of the characters Jerry and Agnes and their development. According to her, this film can serve as a lesson for those who are in a long-distance relationships and a recommendation for the members of Gen Z who haven't seen it.

Accolades

References

External links

1995 films
Star Cinema films
1995 romantic drama films
Philippine romantic drama films
Filipino-language films
Films directed by Olivia Lamasan
Films set in the United States
Films set in the Philippines
Films shot in San Francisco